Numerous ships have been named Tiger after the tiger:

Naval
  - one of 15 vessels of the British Royal Navy by that name
 SMS Tiger (1887), a torpedo ram cruiser of the Austro-Hungarian Navy
  was a tanker that was torpedoed on 1 April 1942 off the coast of Virginia during World War II
 , a Type 24 torpedo boat launched in 1928 and sunk in a collision in 1939
 , the Norwegian destroyer HNoMS Tor captured by Germany in 1940 and renamed Tiger

Commercial
  was launched at Maryland. She was lengthened in 1779. Between 1785 and 1788 she was a whaler in the Southern Whale Fishery. She was last listed in 1795.
  was launched at Liverpool. She made one voyage as a slave ship (1806-7), and was wrecked in 1819.
 Tiger, of 189 tons (bm), was launched in Scotland in 1800. She was lost in 1816 near Pernambuco, Brazil. She was on a voyage from London to Rio de Janeiro.  took her cargo into Rio de Janeiro.
Tiger was condemned in prize on 4 May 1813. She is last listed in 1833.
 Tiger, of 375 tons (bm), was launched in 1835 or 1836. She was wrecked on 12 August 1836 on Astorva Island, Seychelles, on passage from London for Bombay, or Calcutta. All 26 people on board survived. Later, a shark killed one of them; 14 sailed to seek another island from where rescue could be arranged, and disappeared without a trace. The whaler  rescued the remaining 11 people 70 days after the shipwreck.

See also
  - ships of the French Navy by that name 
 Tiger-class cruiser, the last cruiser class of the Royal Navy
 Tiger-class fast attack craft, a post-World War II class of Bundesmarine (German Federal Navy) fast attack craft

Citations & references

ship names